Ardzhidada (Musakay-otar) is a rural locality (a selo) in Kumtorkalinsky District, Republic of Dagestan, Russia. The population was 1,645 as of 2010. There are 12 streets.

Geography 
Ardzhidada is located 69 km northwest of Makhachkala. Krasnoye and Samilakh are the nearest rural localities.

Nationalities 
Kumyks and Awars live there.

References 

Rural localities in Kumtorkalinsky District